Rebecca Peterson (born 6 August 1995) is a Swedish professional tennis player. She has been ranked as high as world No. 43 in singles and world No. 87 in doubles by the Women's Tennis Association (WTA). Peterson has reached two singles finals on the WTA Tour in 2019, winning both of them. She has also reached one WTA Tour doubles final in 2015, in which she also succeeded to win the title. She also owns a doubles title on the WTA Challenger Tour. On the ITF Women's Circuit, she won 12 singles and six doubles titles.

She had her breakthrough into the top 100 in May 2018, so she could play in main draw at most of the WTA Tour tournaments. She got most recognition in 2019, when she won two singles titles and also made her first top-ten win, against Sloane Stephens at the Washington Open. Also, in 2019, she entered top 50 for the first time. She made her Grand Slam debut at the 2017 US Open where she lost in the first round to Denisa Allertová. Among other players, Rebecca is most famous for her aggressive style of play, and she loves to force her forehand. During the 2018 season, she and Johanna Larsson took turns for the Swedish No. 1 in the WTA rankings. After Larsson's retirement in February 2020, Peterson was left as the only Swede inside the top 100 of the WTA rankings.

Early life and background
Rebecca Peterson was born to a Swedish mother, Annelie, and an Estonian father, Mart, in Stockholm. She has one sister, Berit. Her father is her current tennis coach, together with Bosse Ericsson. Rebecca prefers aggressive game style, and likes to control the game with her forehand. During her growing-up, she enjoyed watching Kim Clijsters and Justine Henin.

Junior career
Peterson began playing on the ITF Junior Circuit at age 13. She reached a career-high ranking of No. 24 as a junior, and won one singles title and four doubles titles, winning all of them in 2010.  In singles, her first tournament was Salk Open in January 2009, where she also got her first win, but then lost in the second round. In doubles, her first tournament was the Estonian Junior Open, held in June 2009, where she again lost in the first round. At the same tournament, she reached quarterfinals in singles.

In 2010, she played her first doubles final at the Salk Open, and also won the title. In May 2010, she played in the semifinals of Tennis Sweden Junior Cup in singles, whilst in doubles she won title. In October 2010, she won the Mian-Chang Cup International Junior Championships, her first junior singles title. There, she also won title in doubles.

In June 2012, she played her first Junior Grand Slam event, at the French Open, where in singles, after passing qualifying, she reached the third round, while in doubles she lost in the second round. In Wimbledon and the US Open, she lost in the first round in both singles and doubles. In 2013, she played the second round of the Australian Open in singles, and the first round in doubles. Her last junior tournament was the European Summer Cups in September 2013.

Professional career

2009–12: Playing in both juniors and seniors on the ITF Circuit
Despite the fact that she made her first doubles match on the ITF Women's Circuit in October 2009, she also continued to play in juniors. In 2010, she played qualifying for the Swedish Open but failed to reach main draw. Her first singles tournament was in November 2010 at Stockholm where she defeated German player Alina Wessel in the first round but lost to Alison Van Uytvanck in the second. In 2011, Peterson won only one singles and one doubles match, both at Båstad in May.

2012–17: First steps on the WTA Tour

Peterson debuted on the WTA Tour in 2012, where she was handed a wildcard in both singles and doubles at the 2012 Swedish Open. However, she failed in both competition in the first round. In 2013, Peterson also was handed a wildcard for the 2013 Swedish Open, in both singles and doubles, but again failed to reach second round in both competitions.

In 2014 at the Miami Open, Peterson reached the second round after retirement of Mona Barthel during their first-round match, but Ekaterina Makarova was better in second round. This was Rebecca's first appearance at some Premier 5/Premier Mandatory tournament. For the third time in a row, Rebecca got wildcards for both singles and doubles at 2014 Swedish Open, but this time she was successful in doubles. In singles, she lost in round one to Jana Čepelová, but in doubles, together with Johanna Larsson, she won two matches and entered semifinal, in which Andreja Klepač/María Teresa Torró Flor defeated them.

At the 2015 Rio Open, she failed to qualify in singles but in doubles she booked her first WTA Tour final and succeeded to win the title. At 2015 Nürnberger Versicherungscup, she passed qualifying and then lost to Angelique Kerber. At the Swedish Open, this time in doubles her ranking allowed her to enter the main draw; however, she lost in the first round. But she reached quarterfinals in singles as a wildcard player. At the US Open, she played her first qualifying round at a Grand Slam tournament and finished in the second round. At the Guangzhou Open, Peterson reached second round in singles and semifinals in doubles.

In 2016, Peterson had unnotable results, often reaching first or second rounds but failed to get into main draw at all four Grand Slam tournaments. In doubles, she reached the quarterfinals of the Copa Colsanitas and Swedish Open. Peterson first attempt to play on WTA Tour in 2017 was at Wimbledon, where she was stopped in qualifying. Her first main draw appearance came at the Swedish Open, where she lost in the first round in singles, but in doubles reached the quarterfinals.

Finally, in 2017, she made her main draw  debut at a Grand Slam tournament, after qualifying for the US Open. Then, she reached quarterfinals at the Guanzhou International Open and semifinals at the Taipei Challenger.

2018: Playing on WTA Tour, first WTA semifinal & Major third round, top 100

Peterson started year as world No. 149, so she was forced to play qualifying for the Australian Open in order to play in main draw but failed in round one, losing to Liu Fangzhou in three sets. Then, she reached second round at the Newport Beach Challenger, as well as quarterfinals at Midland.

She qualified for the Mexican Open and defeated Alizé Cornet, Monica Puig, Zhang Shuai, before losing to Stefanie Vögele in the semifinal. At that time, it was her first significant result, reaching her first singles semifinal on WTA Tour. At the Indian Wells Open, she failed in the first round of qualifying, unlike in Miami, where she lost in the first round of the main draw. 
In Morocco, she lost in the first round in singles but reached semifinals in doubles.
In May, she played at the Open de Cagnes-sur-Mer, where she defeated Dayana Yastremska in the final. This led her directly into the top 100, where she debuted.

At French Open, she won three matches in qualifying, and then defeated Hsieh Su-wei in the first round, recording her first match win at a major but lost to Mihaela Buzărnescu in the second round. At Wimbledon, she also reached the second round. At the Western & Southern Open, she qualified for the main draw and beat Kateřina Siniaková but was not good enough for Elise Mertens in the second round.

At the US Open (as in Wimbledon), she entered without qualifying, and made her first third round at a Grand Slam event, winning against Anastasia Pavlyuchenkova and Vania King, respectively, before Kaia Kanepi defeated her in round three. Her last tournament of 2018 was the Wuhan Open where she qualified for the main draw. In the first round, she defeated Tímea Babos but then Caroline Wozniacki was better in the second.

2019: Breakthrough into top 50, two WTA Tour singles titles

In her debut at the Australian Open, she get to the second round, where she lost to Maria Sharapova. At the Newport Beach Challenger, she reached the quarterfinals. She continued with good results, reaching semifinal at the Dow Tennis Classic. In Acapulco, she lost in the first round, so she did at the Indian Wells Open but reached the second round of the Miami Open. In the clay-court season, she did not have some significant result, reaching few second rounds and the quarterfinals at the Morocco Open. At the Italian Open, she passed qualification and lost in the first round to Serena Williams, while at the French Open, she left tournament in the second round, in both singles and doubles. In the grass-court season, she got to the first round of Mallorca Open, third round of the Eastbourne International and first round in Wimbledon. 

At the Washington Open, she upset No. 8 Sloane Stephens, that mark her first top-10 win but then was defeated by Camila Giorgi. Following up, she failed to qualify for the main draw of the Premier 5 Rogers Cup. Then, her next step was another Premier 5 tournament, the Western & Southern Open, where she passed qualifying and defeated Johanna Konta in first round, then Veronika Kudermetova in order to reach third round of a Premier 5/Premier Mandatory tournament for the first time. No. 3 seed Karolína Plíšková then stopped her from reaching her first Premier 5/Premier Mandatory quarterfinal. At the US Open, she defeated Monica Puig in the first round but lost in the second round to Dayana Yastremska. This was first year that Rebecca played at all four majors in the main draw.

During the Asian tour Peterson had a breakthrough. At the Jiangxi International Open, she entered into her first singles final, where she defeated Elena Rybakina. At the Wuhan Open, she won two qualifying matches, and then in the main draw, she defeated Camila Giorgi but lost to Petra Martić in the following round. At China Open, she also passed qualifying but was stopped in the first round of the main draw by Simona Halep. Her last tournament of the year was the Tianjin Open, where she won her second career singles title, defeating Heather Watson in the final. On 14 October, she entered the top 50 for the first time in her career.

2020–21: Health problems and limited play due to COVID, Loss of form 
At the 2020 AucklandOpen, she was defeated by Tamara Zidanšek. In the first round of the Hobart International against Fiona Ferro, she wasn't able to continue the match at 4–4, due to back problems. During the Australian Open, back injury and illness made things even worse. Rebecca lost in the first round to Polona Hercog. After that she had a one-month break, and then returned at the Monterrey Open. There, she won against two Ukrainian players, Kateryna Kozlova and Kateryna Bondarenko, in the first two rounds, and then lost in the quarterfinal to Arantxa Rus.

A few months of inactivity due to the COVID-19 pandemic helped Peterson rest and cure from her back problems, before she played at Palermo Ladies Open, the first WTA tournament after tennis returned in August 2020. In Palermo, she faced Camila Giorgi, but did not make it to the second round. At the Cincinnati Open, she lost to Elise Mertens.

At the 2020 US Open, Peterson was seeded at No. 32 for the first time at a Grand Slam tournament. However, she lost in the first round to Kirsten Flipkens. At the İstanbul Cup, she reached quarterfinals, losing there to Patricia Maria Țig. At the Italian Open, she also lost in the first round, this time to Yulia Putintseva.

At the 2020 French Open, again she left the tournament in the first round, losing to Alison Van Uytvanck.

In 2021, despite reaching three WTA semifinals at the 2021 Chicago Women's Open in August, the 2021 Astana Open in September and the 2021 Transylvania Open in October, she finished the year ranked No. 86 in the singles rankings.

2022: First top-5 win, Australian Open quarterfinal in doubles
Peterson started her 2022 season at the first edition of the Melbourne Summer Set 2. She lost in the second round to qualifier and eventual finalist, Aliaksandra Sasnovich.

Getting past qualifying at the Adelaide International 2, she stunned top seed Aryna Sabalenka in the first round in three sets. She was defeated in the second round by Madison Brengle.
At the Australian Open, she beat Australian wildcard Daria Saville, who was coming back from Achilles surgery, in the first round. She was eliminated from the tournament in the second round by seventh seed Iga Świątek. At the same tournament, she reached the quarterfinals of a Grand Slam championship for the first time in her career, partnering Anastasia Potapova.

In February, Peterson competed at St. Petersburg where she lost, past qualifying, in the first round to Andrea Petkovic.

She finished the year ranked No. 144 in the singles rankings.

2023: First WTA final since 2019 & back to top 100, WTA 1000 fourth round
Ranked No. 140 at the 2023 Mérida Open, she reached her second semifinal as a qualifier at a tournament in Mexico (first was in 2018 at the Abierto Mexicano) defeating fifth seed Alycia Parks and top seed Magda Linette in straight sets. Next she defeated Caty McNally to reach the final. As a result she returned to the top 100 at No. 99 on 27 February 2023, raising up 40 positions.

At the 2023 BNP Paribas Open she reached the third round defeating Marta Kostyuk and 22nd seed Shuai Zhang after retirement. It was only her second third round of a WTA 1000. Next she defeated Jil Teichmann to reach the fourth round for the first time in her career at this WTA level. As a result she moved close to 30 positions up in the rankings in the top 75.

National representation
Peterson made her debut for Sweden in 2014 Fed Cup. The team was host, playing against the Thailand in a play-off in order to remain in World Group II in 2015. Peterson first match happened in doubles, together with Hilda Melander, and they succeeded in winning against Tamarine Tanasugarn/Varatchaya Wongteanchai. Swedish team, with score of 4–0, kept their place in World Group II.

In 2015, Swedish team played against Swiss team in the World Group I Play–off for the chance to be promoted into World Group in 2016. Peterson played her first singles match against Timea Bacsinszky, but lost in straight sets. In doubles, together with Johanna Larsson, they won against Viktorija Golubic/Xenia Knoll but Switzerland won with a score of 3–1. So Swedish team was forced to play in the Play-off, in order to stay in World Group II in 2016. They played against Slovakia, and Peterson faced Anna Karolína Schmiedlová, but failed to win. In doubles, together with Susanne Celik, she lost to Jana Čepelová/Schmiedlová. Swedish team finally lost with a 0–4 score.

Coaches
In August 2019, after Wimbledon Championships, Peterson started a collaboration with Swedish star coach Thomas Högstedt, who previously trained, among others, Maria Sharapova. Together with him, Peterson debuted in the top 50, and also won two WTA singles titles. After six months, in February 2020, they split. She is currently coached by her father (Mart Peterson) and Bosse Eriksson.

Playing style

Peterson is one of the most aggressive tennis players on tour. Her most significant shot is forehand, that she also stated in interview with Live Tennis Italy: "My best shot is the forehand and I try to play by always varying the shot and looking for new solutions." In another interview, Peterson's former coach Thomas Högstedt talked about his impression of Peterson: "Rebecca knows a lot about how she feels herself, other big players maybe more just see how they beat the opponent - if you win the first set then you put in extra gear and decide. It is easy to feel after you are nervous or tired, but the best do not think so much about how they themselves feel. They only think about how to mentally crack the opponent. It's something she needs to work on. I think that bit is very important." Speaking about her game, Hogstedt says: "She has an incredibly good forehand, plays a bit like a men's player with quite a lot of topspin... Very serious, incredibly well trained." Her dad, Mart Peterson, who has also been her coach for most of her career, says: "Hogstedt has helped my daughter a lot and made her tougher. It has been a lot of help. She has become tougher against herself and tougher against her opponents."

Performance timelines

Only main-draw results in WTA Tour, Grand Slam tournaments, Fed Cup/Billie Jean King Cup and Olympic Games are included in win–loss records.

Singles
Current after the 2023 Merida Open.

Doubles

WTA career finals

Singles: 3 (2 titles, 1 runner-up)

Doubles: 1 (title)

WTA Challenger finals

Singles: 1 (runner-up)

Doubles: 2 (1 title, 1 runner-up)

ITF Circuit finals

Singles: 17 (12 titles, 5 runner–ups)

Doubles: 11 (6 titles, 5 runner–ups)

Head-to-head records

Record against top 10 players
Peterson's record against players who have been ranked in the top 10. Active players are in boldface.

Top 10 wins

Notes

References

External links

 
 
 

1995 births
Living people
Tennis players from Stockholm
Swedish female tennis players
Swedish people of Estonian descent
Olympic tennis players of Sweden
Tennis players at the 2020 Summer Olympics
20th-century Swedish women
21st-century Swedish women